Home Sweet Home is a 2016 Kosovan drama film directed by Faton Bajraktari. It was screened at the Karlovy Vary International Film Festival. It was selected as the Kosovan entry for the Best Foreign Language Film at the 89th Academy Awards but it was not nominated.

Cast
 Donat Qosja
 Arta Muçaj
 Shkumbin Istrefi
 Lea Qosja

See also
 List of submissions to the 89th Academy Awards for Best Foreign Language Film
 List of Kosovan submissions for the Academy Award for Best Foreign Language Film

References

External links
 

2016 films
2016 drama films
Kosovan drama films
Albanian-language films
2016 directorial debut films